The Bailey B200 is a British single cylinder, four valve, four stroke aircraft engine, designed and produced by Bailey Aviation of Bassingbourn, Royston, specifically for paramotors, powered hang gliders, microlights and ultralight aircraft.

Design and development
The B200 was designed specifically as a more fuel efficient and quieter replacement for small two-stroke engines that are typically used on this class of aircraft. It produces  and drives a propeller through a 3.2:1 belt style reduction drive.

Applications
Airborne T-Lite

Specifications (B200)

References

Bailey aircraft engines
2000s aircraft piston engines